Julia Farley is a British archaeologist specialising in Iron Age and Roman metalwork. She is the Curator of the European Iron Age & Roman Conquest Period collections at the British Museum.

Career
Farley studied archaeology and anthropology at the University of Cambridge, graduating with a Bachelor of Arts (BA) degree in 2007. She then studied archaeology at Cardiff University, graduating with a Master of Arts (MA) in 2008. She undertook postgraduate research at the University of Leicester, completing her Doctor of Philosophy (PhD) degree in 2012 with a thesis titled "At the Edge of Empire: Iron Age and early Roman metalwork in the East Midlands". 

Following her PhD, she worked at the British Museum for a year as curator of European Iron Age collections before returning to the University of Leicester in 2013 for a three-year Leverhulme Early Career Fellowship. She returned to the British Museum in 2016. She has contributed an article to The Conversation news outlet on metal detecting.
 
Farley was elected as a Fellow of the Society of Antiquaries of London on 12 December 2016.

Select publications
Farley, J. 2011. "The deposition of miniature weaponry in Iron Age Lincolnshire", Pallas. Revue d'études antiques 86, 97-121. 
Farley, J. and Haselgrove, C. 2013. "La conquête romaine et le monnayage en Bretagne insulaire", Dossiers de l’Archéologie 360, 82–5.
Farley, J. 2014. "Some advice for treasure hunters and culture ministers", The Conversation (17 June 2017)
Farley, J., Parfitt, K., and Richardson, A. 2014. "A Late Iron Age Helmet Burial from Bridge, near Canterbury, Kent", Proceedings of the Prehistoric Society 80, 379–388.
Farley, J. and Hunter, F. (eds) 2015. Celts: art and identity. British Museum Press, London. .

References

External links
Dr Julia Farley talks about the Leekfrith Iron Age gold fundraising campaign
How to make a Celtic torc, British Museum Curator’s Corner Season 1 Episode 7

Living people
Year of birth missing (living people)
Place of birth missing (living people)
Fellows of the Society of Antiquaries of London
British archaeologists
British women archaeologists
21st-century archaeologists
People associated with the Portable Antiquities Scheme
Employees of the British Museum
Alumni of the University of Cambridge
Alumni of Cardiff University
Alumni of the University of Leicester